North Mahaska Community School District is a rural public school district located in New Sharon, IA.  The district is located mainly in Mahaska County, with a small portion in Poweshiek County, and serves the cities of New Sharon, Barnes City, the unincorporated communities of Lacey and Taintor, and the surrounding rural areas.

Angela Livezey has served as superintendent since 2015.

History
The communities of Barnes City, Lacey, Taintor, and New Sharon joined to form North Mahaska Community School in 1956.  
In 1997, a bond issue was passed to build a new Elementary School.  In 1999, a new elementary school was completed which connects to the Jr. and Sr. High School by a hallway.  In 2008, the North Mahaska Community School District Early Childhood education center opened, housing the preschool for ages 3 and 4 as well as the Sunshine and Smiles Daycare Center.

Schools
The district operates two schools in a single facility in New Sharon:
 North Mahaska Elementary School
 North Mahaska Jr.-Sr. High School

North Mahaska Jr.-Sr. High School

Athletics
The North Mahaska official mascot is the Warhawk and they are a member of the South Iowa Cedar League conference, and participate in the following sports:

Cross Country
Volleyball
Football
State Champions - 2005
Basketball
Boys' State Champions - 2005
Girls' State Champions - 2012
Wrestling
Track and Field
 Boys' Class 1A State Champions - 1990
Golf
Baseball
Softball

See also
List of school districts in Iowa
List of high schools in Iowa

References

External links
Official website

School districts in Iowa
Education in Mahaska County, Iowa
1956 establishments in Iowa
School districts established in 1956